Beaver Dam Lake is a 6,718 acre lake in Dodge County, Wisconsin. The communities of Beaver Dam, South Beaver Dam, Sunset Beach, Beaver Edge, Fox Lake Junction border the lake. The fish present in the lake are Panfish, Largemouth Bass, Northern Pike, and Walleye. The lake is created by a dam located in the City of Beaver Dam at Haskell Street and flows into the Beaver Dam River. There are seven public boat landings and numerous parks along the lake shore.

Water from Fox Lake flows through the Mill Creek into Beaver Dam Lake.

Islands
There are 26 islands in Beaver Dam Lake ranging from 0.1 to 2.8 acres. All of the islands are privately owned.

See also 
 List of lakes in Wisconsin

References

Lakes of Wisconsin